The 2006 Rice Owls football team represented Rice University in the 2007 NCAA Division I FBS college football season. The Owls were led by head coach Todd Graham, who left the school in January to coach Tulsa. They played their home games at Rice Stadium in Houston, Texas.

Schedule

References

Rice
Rice Owls football seasons
Rice Owls football